The Roman Catholic Diocese of Shinyanga is a diocese located in Shinyanga in the Ecclesiastical province of Mwanza in Tanzania.

History
 June 24, 1950: Established as Apostolic Vicariate of Maswa from the Apostolic Vicariate of Musoma-Maswa
 March 25, 1953: Promoted as Diocese of Maswa
 August 9, 1956: Renamed as Diocese of Shinyanga

Leadership
 Bishops of Shinyanga (Roman rite)
 Bishop Edward Aloysius McGurkin, M.M. (1956.07.04 – 1975.01.30)
 Bishop Castor Sekwa (1975.01.30 – 1996.06.04)
 Bishop Aloysius Balina (1997.08.08 - 2012.11.06); died in office
 Bishop Liberatus Sangu (2015.02.02 - present)

See also
Roman Catholicism in Tanzania

References

Sources
 GCatholic.org
 Catholic Hierarchy

Shinyanga
Shinyanga
Shinyanga
Shinyanga, Roman Catholic Diocese of
1950 establishments in Tanganyika